Norman Eugene "Clint" Walker (May 30, 1927 – May 21, 2018) was an American actor. He played cowboy Cheyenne Bodie in the ABC/Warner Bros. western series Cheyenne from 1955 to 1963.

Early life
Clint Walker was born Norman Eugene Walker in Hartford, Illinois, on May 30, 1927; the son of Gladys Huldah (née Schwanda) and Paul Arnold Walker. His mother was Czech. He had a twin sister named Lucy.

Walker left school to work at a factory and on a riverboat, then joined the United States Merchant Marine at the age of 17 in the last months of World War II.

After leaving the Merchant Marine, he did odd jobs in Brownwood, Texas, Long Beach, California, and Las Vegas, Nevada, where he worked as a doorman at the Sands Hotel. Walker was also employed as a sheet metal worker and a nightclub bouncer.

Career

Early films
Walker became a client of Henry Willson, who renamed him "Jett Norman" and cast him to appear in a Bowery Boys film (Jungle Gents) as a Tarzan-type character. In Los Angeles, he was hired by Cecil B. DeMille to appear in The Ten Commandments.

A friend in the film industry helped get him a few bit parts that brought him to the attention of Warner Bros., which was developing a Western style television series.

Cheyenne

Walker's good looks and imposing physique (he stood 6 feet, 6 inches tall with a 48-inch chest and a 32-inch waist) helped him land an audition where he won the lead role in the TV series Cheyenne.

Billed as "Clint Walker", he was cast as Cheyenne Bodie, a roaming cowboy hero in the post-American Civil War era. His casting was announced in June 1955.

Cheyenne originally appeared as part of Warner Bros. Presents rotating with adaptations of Kings Row and Casablanca. Cheyenne turned out to be the breakout hit.

While the series regularly capitalized on Walker's rugged frame with frequent bare-chested scenes, it was also well-written and acted. It proved hugely popular for eight seasons. Walker's pleasant baritone singing voice was also occasionally utilized on the series and led Warner Brothers to produce an album of Walker performing traditional songs and ballads.

Early in the series run, Warners announced they would star Walker in a feature, The Story of Sam Houston. It was not made.

In April 1956 Walker said "I don't think I'd want any other roles ... Westerns keep me outdoors and active."

Warners cast Walker in the lead of a Western feature film, Fort Dobbs (1958), directed by Gordon Douglas. Howard Thompson described the actor as "the biggest, finest-looking Western hero ever to sag a horse, with a pair of shoulders rivaling King Kong's".

Box office returns were modest. Warners tried him in another Douglas-directed Western, Yellowstone Kelly (1959), co-starring Edd Byrnes from another Warners TV show, 77 Sunset Strip. It was a minor success.

A number of Cheyenne episodes were cut into feature films and released theatrically in some markets, and a brief clip of Walker galloping on horseback as Bodie was featured in an episode of Maverick starring Jack Kelly. He also guest starred on an episode of 77 Sunset Strip. Warners tried Walker in a third Western feature directed by Douglas, Gold of the Seven Saints (1961), this time co-starring Roger Moore, who was also under contract to Warners.

Post-Cheyenne

Walker had a role in Kraft Suspense Theatre (episode "Portrait of an Unknown Man", alongside Robert Duvall). He had a supporting role in the Rock Hudson–Doris Day comedy, Send Me No Flowers (1964).

Frank Sinatra cast him in the leading role in the war drama None but the Brave (1965), the only film Sinatra directed. After doing some guest appearances in The Lucy Show he fought a grizzly bear in Paramount's Western, The Night of the Grizzly (1966). He starred in a family adventure movie shot in India, Maya (1966).

Walker had his biggest feature film hit to date when he played the meek convict Samson Posey in the war drama The Dirty Dozen (1967).

Walker returned to Westerns with More Dead Than Alive (1969). The New York Times described the actor as "a big, fine-looking chap and about as live-looking as any man could be. And there is something winning about his taciturn earnestness as an actor, although real emotion seldom breaks through".

Walker had support roles in two comic Westerns, Sam Whiskey (1969) and The Great Bank Robbery (1969).

1970s
Walker was one of many names in The Phynx (1970) and returned to TV with the leads in some television pilots that appeared as made for television movies on the ABC Movie of the Week, Yuma (1971), Hardcase (1972), and The Bounty Man (1972).

In May 1971 he was seriously injured in a skiing accident on Mammoth Mountain when one of his ski poles went through his chest but he recovered.

Walker supported Telly Savalas in the biopic Pancho Villa (1972) and starred a short-lived series in 1974 called Kodiak, playing an Alaskan patrolman. He starred in the made-for-television cult film Killdozer! The same year as well as Scream of the Wolf (1974).

Walker starred in Baker's Hawk (1976) and had support parts in Snowbeast (1977), and The White Buffalo (1977). He starred in the Canadian Deadly Harvest (1977) and had a small role in Centennial and Mysterious Island of Beautiful Women (1979).

Literary pursuits
Walker met western author Kirby Jonas through James Drury, a mutual friend. Jonas and Walker subsequently spent two years collaborating on a storyline by Walker involving gold and the Yaqui. The partnership led to the publication of the 2003 Western novel Yaqui Gold.

Honors

Walker has a star on the Hollywood Walk of Fame at 1505 Vine Street, near its intersection with Sunset Boulevard.

In 2004, he was inducted into the Hall of Great Western Performers at the National Cowboy & Western Heritage Museum in Oklahoma City, Oklahoma.

He received the Golden Boot Award in 1997.

In 2017 he was presented an inlaid bronze star medallion on the Texas Trail of Fame in the Fort Worth Stockyards National Historic District.

Personal life and death
Walker had three marriages, each of which lasted approximately twenty years. Walker married Verna Garver in 1948. The marriage produced one daughter, Valerie (born 1950) before ending in divorce in 1968. Valerie became one of the first female airline pilots. Walker was a pesce pollotarian, stating, "we don't eat beef, but we eat chicken and salmon."

Walker supported Barry Goldwater in the 1964 United States presidential election.

In May 1971, Walker narrowly escaped death in a skiing accident at Mammoth Mountain, California. While following the contours of the twisting, irregular terrain Walker began tumbling out of control before coming to an abrupt, violent stop in which he was pierced through the heart with a ski pole. He was taken to a hospital and pronounced dead. However, a doctor detected faint signs of life and rushed Walker to surgery, where his damaged heart was repaired. Within two months, Walker was working again. Walker has said about the accident that he had a near-death experience. 

Walker died of congestive heart failure in Grass Valley, California, on May 21, 2018, nine days before his 91st birthday.

Filmography 

1954: Jungle Gents as Tarzan Type (uncredited)
1955–1963: Cheyenne  (TV series) as Cheyenne Bodie / Ace Black / Jim Thornton Merritt
1956: The Ten Commandments as Sardinian Captain
1957: The Travellers as Cheyenne Bodie
1958: Fort Dobbs as Gar Davis
1959: Yellowstone Kelly as Luther 'Yellowstone' Kelly
1960: Requiem to Massacre as Cheyenne Bodie
1961: Gold of the Seven Saints as Jim Rainbolt
1963: The Jack Benny Program 
1964: Send Me No Flowers as Bert Power
1965: None but the Brave as Capt. Dennis Bourke
1965–1966: The Lucy Show (TV Series, 2 episodes) as Frank / Frank Wilson
1966: The Night of the Grizzly as Jim Cole
1966: Maya as Hugh Bowen
1967: The Dirty Dozen as Samson Posey
1969: More Dead Than Alive as Cain
1969: Sam Whiskey as O. W. Bandy
1969: The Great Bank Robbery as Ranger Ben Quick
1970: The Phynx as Cheyenne
1971: Yuma (TV Movie) as Marshal Dave Harmon
1972: Hardcase (TV Movie) as Jack Rutherford
1972: The Bounty Man (TV Movie) as Kinkaid
1972: Pancho Villa as Scotty
1974: Kodiak (13 episodes) as Cal "Kodiak" McKay
1974: Scream of the Wolf (TV Movie) as Byron Douglas
1974: Killdozer! (TV Movie) as Lloyd Kelly
1976: Baker's Hawk as Dan Baker
1977: The White Buffalo as Whistling Jack Kileen
1977: Snowbeast (TV Movie) as Sheriff Paraday
1977: Deadly Harvest as Grant Franklin
1978: Centennial (TV Mini-Series) as Joe Bean
1979: Mysterious Island of Beautiful Women (TV Movie) as Wendell
1983: Hysterical as Sheriff
1983: The Love Boat (Episode: "Friend of the Family/Affair on Demand/Just Another Pretty Face") as Bill
1985: The Serpent Warriors as Morgan Bates
1985: All American Cowboy (TV Movie) 
1991: The Gambler Returns: The Luck of the Draw (TV Movie) as Cheyenne Bodie
1993: Tropical Heat (TV) — episode "The Last of the Magnificent"
1994: Maverick as Sheriff (cameo appearance) (Scene deleted)
1995: Kung Fu: The Legend Continues (TV) as Cheyenne Bodie, episode "Gunfighters"
1998: Small Soldiers as Nick Nitro (Voice) (final film role)

References

External links

 
 
 "Clint Walker: Top Gun of Warner's TV" by Herb Fagen (1999 interview) @ Classic Images magazine, issue # 212, p. 12
 "Belleville had its share of fame: Nice guy Clint Walker became Hollywood hunk" by Jaime Ingle — News-Democrat (Wednesday, June 18, 2008)
 "Cowboy actor inspires local Western writer" — From the Idaho State Journal — December 2003
 

1927 births
2018 deaths
20th-century American male actors
American country singer-songwriters
American male film actors
American male television actors
American people of Czech descent
American sailors
California Republicans
Country musicians from California
Country musicians from Illinois
Country musicians from Texas
Illinois Republicans
Male actors from Illinois
Male actors from Las Vegas
Male Western (genre) film actors
Military personnel from Illinois
People from Brownwood, Texas
People from Grass Valley, California
People from Long Beach, California
People from Los Angeles
People from Madison County, Illinois
Singer-songwriters from California
Singer-songwriters from Illinois
Singer-songwriters from Texas
American twins
Warner Bros. contract players
Western (genre) television actors
United States Merchant Mariners
United States Merchant Mariners of World War II